Epilobium obscurum is a species of flowering plant belonging to the family Onagraceae.

Its native range is Macaronesia, Northwestern Africa, Europe to Turkey.

References

obscurum